Dimethyloctadecyl(3-trimethoxysilylpropyl)ammonium chloride (DTSACl) is a disinfectant used as a preservative and fungicide.  Its chemical formula is C26H58NO3SiCl.  It is also used as a silane coupling agent.

See also
 Dimethyldioctadecylammonium chloride

References

Disinfectants